The Highland Railway P class was a group of five  steam locomotives built in 1891 and 1893 by Dübs and Company of Glasgow.

History
In 1891 Dübs and Company of Glasgow completed two  locomotives. They were part of an order for five for the Uruguay Eastern Railway, but due to financial problems the order was cancelled and the engines were offered for sale.

The locomotives were purchased by the Highland Railway in 1892, where they were numbered 101 and 102. Although their cowcatchers and large headlights were removed before entering service, they retained a somewhat American appearance quite unlike other HR designs of the period, lacking the classic Allan framing and sweep of plating from the widest part of the smokebox to the cylinders. They were nicknamed Yankees, although the official designation from 1901 was 'P' Class.

Three further locomotives were delivered by Dübs in 1893, possibly comprising the balance of the Uruguay order. These had standard Highland Railway fittings but were otherwise identical to the first two. They were originally numbered 11, 14 and 15, but were renumbered 51, 50 and 52 in 1899–1900, and 50 was again renumbered to 54 in 1901.

Dimensions
The locomotives had  driving wheels and  outside cylinders.

Use
They were used on branch line services, including those to Burghead, Fortrose, Portessie and Aberfeldy. One (no. 52) was used on the Invergarry and Fort Augustus Railway while that line was leased to the Highland.

Transfer to LMS
In 1923 they passed to the London, Midland and Scottish Railway (LMS) and became LMS 15013–15017. They were withdrawn between 1924 and 1934.

Numbering

References
 
 
 

P class
4-4-0T locomotives
Dübs locomotives
Railway locomotives introduced in 1891
Standard gauge steam locomotives of Great Britain
Scrapped locomotives
Passenger locomotives